The 2007–08 season is the 98th season of competitive football in Germany.

Promotion and relegation

Pre Season

Post Season

National teams

Germany national football team

UEFA Euro 2008 qualification

UEFA Euro 2008

Friendly matches

Germany women's national football team

2007 FIFA Women's World Cup

League season

Men

Bundesliga

2. Bundesliga

Women

Bundesliga

2. Bundesliga

North

South

Transfers
List of German football transfers summer 2007
List of German football transfers winter 2007–08

Sources

 
Seasons in German football